Alexey Ivanovich Sudayev (23 August 1912 – 17 August 1946) was a Soviet firearm designer.

Biography
He lived in Leningrad, and participated in the defense of the city. The PPS was developed to be mass-produced for the defense of Leningrad.

Sudayev designed one of the first Soviet assault rifles for the new intermediate cartridge 7.62×39mm, the AS-44. The first prototype was tested in 1944, and found to function adequately by the Red army, though it was considered too heavy at 5.6 kg. Sudayev then worked on a second, lighter prototype that weighed only 5.35 kg. However, the second prototype had accuracy and reliability problems, which needed to be resolved. However, Sudayev became seriously ill and died in 1946, a week before his 34th birthday and before his design could be finalized.

Awards 
 USSR State Prize (1946)
 Order of Lenin
 Medal "For the Defence of Leningrad"
 Medal "For the Victory over Germany in the Great Patriotic War 1941–1945"

Inventions 
 anti-aircraft machine gun mount (1941)
 PPS submachine gun
 AS-44 assault rifle

References

1912 births
1946 deaths
People from Alatyr, Chuvash Republic
People from Alatyrsky Uyezd
Firearm designers
Soviet inventors
Soviet engineers
Stalin Prize winners
Recipients of the Order of Lenin
Burials at Vagankovo Cemetery